Sbarro, LLC is an American pizzeria chain that specializes in New York-style pizza sold by the slice and other Italian-American cuisine. In 2011, the company was ranked 15th in foreign sales among U.S.-based quick-serve and fast-casual companies by QSR Magazine. In 2008, Sbarro was rated the #1 Quick Service Restaurant in the Italian segment by Entrepreneur magazine. Not all reports were positive, as the food quality had been criticized, with a suggestion that this was a factor that led to two bankruptcies.
Sbarro has over 600 locations in 28 countries. Sbarro stores are located in shopping malls, airports, service areas, and college campuses, as well as in The Pentagon, American naval bases, and casinos.

History

20th century 
Sbarro was founded in 1956 by Gennaro and Carmela Sbarro. The couple and their three sons, Joseph, Mario, and Anthony, immigrated to America from Naples, Italy. The same year, the Sbarro family opened their first salumeria (an Italian grocery store) at 1701 65th Street and 17th Avenue in Bensonhurst, Brooklyn, New York, which became popular for its fresh food and Italian fare. Its original location closed down in 2004.

The success of the Sbarro Salumeria led to the opening of additional locations in the New York City metropolitan area. In 1970, Sbarro opened its first mall-based restaurant in Brooklyn's Kings Plaza Shopping Center. One of their busiest outlets was one of two which were both located original World Trade Center, with the busiest being located the mall underneath the complex, while the other was located at the observation deck on the South Tower. However, both outlets were destroyed in the September 11 attacks in 2001.

The first Sbarro in the Philippines was opened in 1990. As of 2023, the nation currently has 56 stores.

21st century
In early 2007, Sbarro was acquired by MidOcean Partners, a private equity firm with offices in New York and London.

The company filed for Chapter 11 bankruptcy protection on April 4, 2011. At the time it was ranked by Pizza Today as the country's fifth-largest pizza chain. It was the third-largest pizza chain to declare bankruptcy in less than a year. Earlier, Round Table Pizza (ranked no. 10) and Uno Chicago Grill (ranked no. 11), through its parent Uno Restaurant Holdings, filed bankruptcy. Uno has since emerged.

In November 2011, Sbarro was granted court approval to emerge from bankruptcy under a plan requiring restructuring and ceding ownership to lenders; 25 sites were closed. In January 2012, James J. Greco was brought in as CEO of Sbarro to implement a turnaround plan as the company emerged from bankruptcy. Sbarro rebranded, updating its pizza recipe, food offerings, and branding, and bringing fresh ingredients back to the forefront of the menu.

On March 15, 2012, Sbarro announced a franchise agreement with Upper Crust Foods Pvt. Ltd. to open restaurants in the Indian state of Maharashtra. The franchise will develop and operate the restaurants. In July 2015 Sbarro announced that they planned to expand to 50 outlets in two years, from the 17 they had then.

In March 2013, Sbarro announced that J. David Karam would be the next CEO of the company. In March of the following year, the company again filed for Chapter 11 bankruptcy protection.

Sbarro announced on June 3, 2014, that they had exited from bankruptcy protection on June 2 based on a reorganization plan as approved by the court on May 19. One hundred and eighty-two locations were closed and the company announced plans to move its headquarters from New York City to Columbus, Ohio.

In January 2015, Sbarro's logo changed from a design resembling the Italian national flag, to an outline of a pizza slice in red and green, with the words "NYC.1956" to recollect the establishment's Brooklyn origins.

In 2016, Sbarro had 318 locations in the U.S., less than half of 12 years earlier. The decline of mall food courts and changing dietary choices among Americans are felt to be the major factors in Sbarro's regression.

Entering the UK market
On November 5, 2020, Sbarro announced it had agreed a partnership with the EG Group, a UK based retail group, to enter the UK market - with the first store opening in EG’s Armada location in Birmingham, West Midlands. As of June 22, 2022, Sbarro has 15 stores in the UK, 7 of which are located within the North West of England. It plans to expand its locations throughout 2022.

Response to the 2022 Russian invasion of Ukraine
During the 2022 Russian invasion of Ukraine, Sbarro Pizza refused to join the international community's withdrawal from the Russian market. Research from Yale University that covered how companies were reacting to Russia's invasion, identified Sbarro in the worst category of "Digging In", meaning "Defying Demands for Exit: companies defying demands for exit/reduction of activities". They received the lowest possible grade for continuing business as usual.

Cucinova

In October 2013, Sbarro opened the first location of their fast-casual concept called Cucinova. The restaurants feature Neapolitan-style pizzas made to order with fresh, high-end ingredients and baked in woodstone ovens in under three minutes. Cucinova had multiple locations in Ohio and Texas before closing in 2020 due to COVID-19 pandemic.

See also

 List of pizza chains of the United States
 Sbarro restaurant suicide bombing

References

External links

Companies based in the Columbus, Ohio metropolitan area
Restaurants established in 1956
Multinational companies headquartered in the United States
Pizza chains of the United States
Pizza franchises
Pizzerias in New York City
Fast-food chains of the United States
Privately held companies based in Ohio
Restaurant chains in the United States
Companies that filed for Chapter 11 bankruptcy in 2011
Companies that filed for Chapter 11 bankruptcy in 2014
1956 establishments in New York City
American companies established in 1956
Defunct restaurant chains in Israel
Restaurants in Ohio
Italian-American culture in New York City